The Philippine Judo Federation is the national governing body for Judo in the Philippines. It  is accredited by the International Judo Federation which is the governing body for the sport of Judo in the world.

References

External links
Philippine Judo Federation profile at the Philippine Olympic Committee website

Philippines
Judo in the Philippines
Judo